Janov is a Czech and Slovak toponym derived from personal name Jan, meaning John's:

Places

Czech Republic
Janov (Bruntál District), a town in the Moravian-Silesian Region
Janov (Děčín District), a municipality and village in the Ústí nad Labem Region
Janov (Rakovník District), a municipality and village in the Central Bohemian Region
Janov (Rychnov nad Kněžnou District), a municipality and village in the Hradec Králové Region
Janov (Svitavy District), a municipality and village in the Pardubice Region
Janov nad Nisou, a municipality and village in the Liberec Region
Janov, a village and part of Kočov in the Plzeň Region
Janov, a village and part of Kosova Hora in the Central Bohemian Region
Janov, a town part of Litvínov in the Ústí nad Labem Region
Janov, a village and part of Mladá Vožice in the South Bohemian Region
Janov, a village and part of Nový Bor in the Liberec Region
Janov, a village and part of Roudná in the South Bohemian Region
Janov, a village and part of Staré Hobzí in the South Bohemian Region

Italy
Janov, Czech and Slovak exonym for Genoa

Slovakia
Janov, Prešov District, a municipality and village in the Prešov Region

People
Arthur Janov, American psychologist
Janov's warnings was named after him
Matthias of Janov, Bohemian ecclesiastical writer

Fictional
Janov Pelorat, a character in the Foundation Series of books by Isaac Asimov

See also
Janów (disambiguation)
Yaniv (disambiguation)